Agh Mazar (also Romanized as Āgh Mazār) is a village in Atrak Rural District, Maneh District, Maneh and Samalqan County, North Khorasan Province, Iran. At the 2006 census, its population was 537, in 115 families.

References 

Populated places in Maneh and Samalqan County